Franck Fisseux (born 19 February 1985) is an athlete from Avignon, France.  He competes in archery.

Fisseux competed at the 2004 Summer Olympics in men's individual archery.  He was defeated in the first round of elimination, placing 38th overall. Fisseux was also a member of the 10th-place French men's archery team at the 2004 Summer Olympics.

References

1985 births
Living people
Archers at the 2004 Summer Olympics
French male archers
Olympic archers of France